Frank Leonard Glicksman (June 29, 1921 – January 19, 1984) was an American producer and screenwriter. He was known for developing the medical drama television series Trapper John, M.D. with Don Brinkley. Glicksman  also co-created the medical drama television series Medical Center with Al C. Ward. His producing and screenwriting credits include Custer, The Long, Hot Summer, Climax! and 12 O'Clock High. He died in January 1984 at the Cedars-Sinai Medical Center in Los Angeles, California, at the age of 62.

References

External links 

1921 births
1984 deaths
People from New York (state)
Television producers from New York (state)
Screenwriters from New York (state)
American male screenwriters
American television writers
American male television writers
American television producers
20th-century American screenwriters
University of California, Los Angeles alumni